Willie Cathey is an American former Negro league pitcher who played in the 1940s.

Cathey played for the Indianapolis Clowns in 1948. He went on to play minor league baseball for the Minot Mallards of the Mandak League in 1950 and 1951.

References

External links
 and Baseball-Reference Black Baseball Stats and Seamheads

Year of birth missing
Place of birth missing
Indianapolis Clowns players
Baseball pitchers
Minot Mallards players